Roger Lacolle (8 January 1898 – 8 March 1973) was a French racing cyclist. He rode in the 1923 Tour de France.

References

1898 births
1973 deaths
French male cyclists
Place of birth missing